This list of rowing venues contains the rowing sites, that allow for international rowing regattas (2,000 m), as described by FISA. Most of these sites have hosted an Olympic or world championship regatta.

Olympic venues
 (1896) Athens, Greece - Port of Piraeus, Piraeus (bad weather cancelled racing)
 (1900) Paris, France - River Seine (4 lanes)
 (1904) St. Louis, Missouri, United States - Creve Coeur Lake (overgrown – short)
 (1908) London, England - Henley-on-Thames (2 lanes)
 (1912) Stockholm, Sweden - Djurgårdsbrunnsviken
 (1920) Brussels, Antwerp - Belgium Brussels-Antwerp Canal (2 lanes)
 (1924) Paris, France - River Seine (4 lanes)
 (1928) Amsterdam, Netherlands - Sloten Canal, Sloten (2 lanes)
 (1932) Los Angeles, United States - Long Beach Marine Stadium, Long Beach, California
 (1936) Berlin, Germany - Langer See, Grünau (6 lane FISA)
 (1948) London, England - Henley-on-Thames (3 lanes)
 (1952) Helsinki, Finland - Seurasaarenselkä Bay, Meilahti
 (1956) Melbourne, Australia - Lake Wendouree, Ballarat (dry – drought)
 (1960) Rome, Italy - Lake Albano  (origin of the Albano buoy system)
 (1964) Tokyo, Japan - Toda Rowing Course, Toda, Saitama (6 lane FISA)
 (1968) Mexico City, Mexico - Lake Xochimilco (6 lane FISA)
 (1972) Munich, Germany - Regattastrecke Oberschleißheim (6 lane FISA)
 (1976) Montreal, Quebec, Canada - Montreal Rowing Basin   (6 lane FISA)
 (1980) Moscow, Russia - Krylatskoye Rowing Canal, Krylatskoye (8 lane FISA)
 (1984) Los Angeles, United States - Lake Casitas
 (1988) Seoul, Korea - Misari Regatta (8 lane FISA)
 (1992) Barcelona, Spain - L'estany de Banyoles, Banyoles,   (8 lane FISA)
 (1996) Atlanta, United States - Lake Lanier, Gainesville, Georgia
 (2000) Sydney, Australia - Sydney International Regatta Centre (8 lane FISA)
 (2004) Athens Greece - Schinias Olympic Rowing and Canoeing Centre, Marathon (8 lane FISA)
 (2008) Beijing, China - Shunyi Olympic Rowing-Canoeing Park, Shunyi District (8 lane FISA)
 (2012) London, England - Dorney Lake, Eton (8 lane FISA)
 (2016) Rio de Janeiro, Brazil - Lagoa Rodrigo de Freitas, Lagoa
 (2020) Tokyo, Japan - Central Breakwater, Tokyo Bay
 (2024) Paris, France - Vaires-Sur-Marne Nautical Stadium, Vaires-sur-Marne
 (2028) Los Angeles, United States - Lake Perris, Perris
 (2032) Brisbane, Australia - TBD

European venues
 Ada Ciganlija Belgrade, Serbia
 Allermöhe, Hamburg, Germany
 Bagsvaerd Copenhagen, Denmark
 Baldeneysee, Essen, Germany
 Beetzsee, Brandenburg, Germany
 Bosbaan, Amsterdam, Netherlands
 Brest, Belarus
 Lac du Causse, Brive-la-Gaillarde France
 Canal Olímpic de Catalunya, Castelldefels, Catalonia, Spain
 Centro Sportivo Remiero della Marina Militare, Sabaudia, Italy
 Elfrather See, Krefeld, Germany
 Fühlingen, Cologne, Germany
 Gravelines, France
 Hazewinkel (Bloso Sports Center), Belgium
 Holme Pierrepont National Watersports Centre, Nottingham, England
 Idroscalo, Milan, Italy
 Ioannina, Greece
 Kaukajärvi, Tampere, Finland
 Klagenfurt, Austria
 Kruszwica, Poland
 Lac d'Aiguebelette, Aiguebelette, France
 Lake Bled, Bled, Slovenia
 Lake Jarun, Zagreb, Croatia
 La Cartuja, Guadalquivir, Seville, Spain
 Lake Malta, Poznań, Poland
 London Regatta Centre, London, England
 Minsk, Belarus
 Montemor-o-Velho, Portugal
 Ottensheim, Austria
 Piediluco, Italy
 Plovdiv, Bulgaria
 Račice, Roudnice, Czech Republic
 Redgrave Pinsent Rowing Lake, Caversham, England
 Rotsee, Lucerne, Switzerland
 Strathclyde Country Park, Motherwell, Scotland
 Szegedi Olimpiai Központ, Szeged, Hungary
 Trakai, Lithuania
 Vaires-sur-Marne, France
 Varese, Italy
 Vienna, Austria
 Wedau, Duisburg, Germany
 Willem-Alexander Baan, Rotterdam, Netherlands

North American venues
 Nathan Benderson Park, Sarasota, United States (Class C, Wind, Heat)
 Eagle Creek Park, Indianapolis, United States
 Oklahoma River, Oklahoma City, United States (Class C, Wind, Heat)
 Royal Canadian Henley Rowing Course, St. Catharines, Canada (8 lane FISA Class A)

Asian venues
 Jakabaring Lake, Palembang, Indonesia
 Manggar Reservoir, Balikpapan, Indonesia
 Nagaragawa International Regatta Course, Gifu Prefecture, Japan
 Samarkand Rowing Canal, Samarkand, Uzbekistan
 Sha Tin Rowing Centre, Sha Tin, Hong Kong
 Shanghai Water Sports Centre, Dianshan Lake, Shanghai, China
 Situ Cipule, Karawang Regency, Indonesia
 Yarkon River, Tel Aviv, Israel
 Youtefa Bay, Jayapura, Indonesia

Oceania venues
 Champion Lakes, Perth Western Australia, Australia
 Lake Barrington Tasmania, Australia
 Lake Karapiro, Hamilton, New Zealand

South American venues
 Laguna de los Padres, Mar del Plata, Argentina
 Lago Paranoá, Brasília, Brazil

 
Lists of bodies of water
Lists of sports venues
Venues